Czesław Dźwigaj (born 18 June 1950 in Nowy Wiśnicz) is a Polish artist, sculptor, and professor. Creator of numerous monuments, he is most often associated with monuments of Pope John Paul II, almost 50 of which have left his workshop.

Artistic career

A student of Antoni Hajdecki, Dźwigaj completed his studies at the Academy of Fine Arts in Kraków in the years 1972-77, where he now directs the studio of Ceramic Sculpture in addition to lecturing on sacred art at the Pontifical Academy of Theology in Kraków.

He began his artistic career working with the Roman Catholic Church. In the 1980s he completed a series of bronze casts for the cathedral in Tarnów, Poland.  This work established his reputation, and he became known and popular as an artist of sacred art in other areas of Poland.

He has also designed numerous church interiors along with monumental bas-relief doors.  Professor Dźwigaj is also the laureate of many prestigious awards from exhibitions and art competitions such as the Gold medal at the Biennale in Ravenna.

Notable works

The Monument to the Victims of December 1970 in Szczecin. Unveiled on 28 August 2005 on plac Solidarności on the 25th anniversary of the founding of Solidarity, this 11-metre-tall and nearly 9-and-a-half-ton bronze monument commemorates the tragic events of December 1970, when, following workers’ demonstrations on the streets of Szczecin, 16 people were killed. The monument is of an angel standing on a ship which is breaking through the concrete slabs of the ground to rise above the earth.  Commemorative plaques bear the names of the victims.
A landmark sculpture of Christ the King in front of St. Mary of Częstochowa in Cicero, a Neogothic church built in the so-called 'Polish Cathedral' style along with the monumental bronze doors at St. Hyacinth's Basilica in Chicago, as well as monuments of Pope John Paul II in both Wyandotte, Michigan and Chicago.
The Tolerance Monument unveiled in Jerusalem in  2008, in collaboration with sculptor Michal Kubiak. It is situated on a hill marking the divide between Jewish Armon HaNetziv and Arab Jabel Mukaber, standing opposite the United Nations headquarters in Jerusalem in a park near Goldman Promenade.
A monumental bas-relief of the Tree of Jesse incorporated into the Church of the Nativity brought by Pope Benedict XVI during his trip to the Holy Land offered as a gift to the people of Bethlehem. Measuring in at 3 and a quarter meters wide and 4 meters in height, its corpus represents an olive tree figuring as the Tree of Jesse displaying Christ's lineage from Abraham through St. Joseph along with other biblical motifs. Situated along the passage used by pilgrims making their way to the Grotto of the Nativity, the bas relief also incorporates symbolism from the Old Testament. The upper portion is dominated by a crowned figure of Christ the King in an open-armed pose blessing the Earth.

Sites outside Poland with monuments to Pope John Paul II by Professor Dźwigaj (partial list)

 Chicago (2)
 Wyandotte, Michigan
 Rome, Italy
 Hanover, Germany
 Šiluva, Lithuania
 Fátima, Portugal
 Posadas, Argentina
 San Cristóbal de La Laguna, España

References

Further reading:
 (kar), Papież na placu Sapera, "Gazeta Współczesna" 2000, nr 61.  +
 Annusiewicz Małgorzata, Trzy pytania do prof. Czesława Dźwigaja, "Głos Szczeciński" 2005, nr 12.
 Bogacz Jerzy, Rozmowa o pomniku z jego twórcą prof. Czesławem Dźwigajem, "Echo Limanowskie" 1998, nr 54.
 Czesław Dźwigaj, red. Krzysztof Kozłowski, Kraków 2004.
 Dańko Ireneusz, Pamięć, która dzieli, "Gazeta Wyborcza Kraków" 2005, nr 59.
 Jankowski Stanisław M., W soli jeszcze nie pracowałem... - rozm. z Czesławem Dźwigajem, "AWS" 1999, nr 26.
 Ochwat Renata, O pomnikach profesora Czesława Dźwigaja, "Gazeta Zachodnia" 2002, nr 146.
 Ożóg Kazimierz S., Rzeźba jest trudna. O najciekawszych pomnikach Jana Pawła II, "Ethos" 2004, nr 3, s. 299-314, fot.
 Ożóg Kazimierz S., Pomniki Jana Pawła II – kilka problemów zjawiska, [w:] Prolegomena. Materiały Spotkania Doktorantów Historyków Sztuki, Kraków 13-15 X 2003, Kraków 2005, s. 183-192, fot.
 Ożóg Kazimierz S., Opowieści rzeźby, "Nawias" 2006, s. 98-107.
 Ożóg Kazimierz S., Jan Paweł II jak krasnal. Pomniki na rozdrożu, "Orońsko" 2005, nr 4, s. 52-55, fot.
 Satała Marian, Papieski rzeźbiarz, "Gazeta Krakowska" 2005, nr 83.
 Starzak Grażyna, Papież wśród królów - rozm. z Czesławem Dźwigajem, "Dziennik Polski" 2000, nr 63.
 Trybowski Ignacy, Czesław Dźwigaj, "Krak" 1985, nr 25.
 Wątróbski Leszek, Pomnik Papieża Jana Pawła II w Policach, rozm. z Czesławem Dźwigajem, "Kurier Szczeciński" 1999, nr 100.
 Wątróbski Leszek, Siedem rzeźb i pomników, "Nasz Dziennik" 1999, nr 83.
 Wątróbski Leszek, Ten, który rzeźbi papieża, rozm. z. Czesławem Dźwigajem, "Nowy Dziennik" 1999, nr z dnia 1 VI.

See also

 Polish Cathedral style
 Roman Catholicism in Poland
 Tolerance Monument

1950 births
Living people
People from Bochnia County
20th-century Polish sculptors
Polish male sculptors
21st-century Polish sculptors
Modern sculptors
Polish Roman Catholics
Catholic sculptors
20th-century male artists